Jonathan H. Smith (born January 17, 1971),better known by his stage name Lil Jon, is an American rapper, producer and former frontman of the rap group Lil Jon & the East Side Boyz. He was instrumental in the emergence of the hip hop subgenre crunk, and is credited with bringing the genre into mainstream success. Lil Jon frequently collaborates with Miami-based rapper Pitbull, Bay Area-based rappers Too Short and E-40. He participates as one-third of an unofficial trio consisting of Atlanta-based artists Ludacris and Usher who frequently create songs together.

As a producer, Lil Jon has produced several Billboard Hot 100 hit singles including "Salt Shaker", "Cyclone", "Get Low", "Snap Yo Fingers", "Damn!", "Freek-a-Leek", "Lovers and Friends", "Goodies" and "Yeah!". As a five-time Grammy award nominee, Lil Jon won a Grammy Award for Best Rap/Sung Performance with Usher and Ludacris for "Yeah!"

In 2013, Lil Jon collaborated with producer DJ Snake and released "Turn Down For What" an EDM single that, as of 2021, has gone 6× multi-platinum in the United States. The song went on to win the Billboard Music Award for Top Dance/Electronic Song. The accompanying music video was nominated for a Grammy Award for Best Music Video, and has been viewed over 1.14 billion times on YouTube as of January 2023.

Listed as one of the Top Billboard Music Award Winners of All Time in 2016, Lil Jon achieved his 8th number 1 on Billboards Rhythmic Chart as a songwriter on "My Type" a song by California rapper Saweetie and was also a songwriter on the rapper's single "Tap In" which reached number 2 on the same chart.

Early life 
Lil Jon was born Atlanta, Georgia and raised in a middle-class neighborhood located in Southwest Atlanta. He is the oldest of five children born to his father, an aerospace engineer with former military service, and his mother, with a medical career within the military. Three of his siblings would later follow their parents lead and also serve in the United States military.

Lil Jon attended Beecher Hills Elementary School and Southwest Middle School, both located within the Atlanta Public School district. His mother described him as a high achiever early on in addition to being independent and a passionate reader. While in middle school, Lil Jon became lifelong friends with Robert McDowell, Dwayne "Emperor" Searcy (future DJ and radio personality for Radio One's WHTA), and Vince Philips (named one of Billboard's Top Music Lawyers in 2020), who would become business partners. The foursome quickly became immersed in the skateboarding culture and would later work at Skate Escape, a popular skate and bicycle shop near the city's iconic Piedmont Park. While his best friends attended Benjamin E. Mays High School, Lil Jon attended Frederick Douglass High School for their magnet program and was a member of the marching band. The guys also began to frequently attend concerts at the Masquerade, to see their favorite bands, including Agent Orange and Red Hot Chili Peppers.

At the age of 15, Smith taught himself how to DJ, and although his parents were strict, they gave him a chance to work on his DJ skills by allowing him to have house parties in the basement of the family home, citing that they would rather have him under their watch than for him to "be in the street somewhere riding out." The parties, hosted by Lil Jon and Searcy "Old E and Chicken Parties", which became extremely popular with teenagers in the area. In addition to working at the skate shop, Lil Jon also began spinning at house parties and working in local dance clubs as a DJ. Eventually Smith became an in house DJ at Phoenix, a popular Atlanta nightclub at the time. It was there he would meet established music artists such as Jermaine Dupri, TLC, Notorious BIG, Craig Mack and Mary J. Blige.

Career

1991–2000: So So Def  
After graduating high school, Lil Jon continued to work as a DJ in popular downtown Atlanta clubs. It was there he met Atlanta music producer, Jermaine Dupri. When it came to hiring an A&R to lead his Atlanta-based music label So So Def, Jermaine Dupri stated that "All I could think about was Lil Jon, because he was the person in the clubs. He knew people, DJs knew him. I had to hire him."

After he was promoted to Executive Vice President of A&R, Lil Jon recruited local producers and rappers DJ Smurf, Shawty Redd, Raheem the Dream, Playa Poncho with others to create the compilation album series, So So Def Bass All Stars as his first project. Released on May 22, 1996, the album was a success, selling over 500,000 units and was certified gold by the RIAA on September 19, 1996, four months after its initial release. The album, executive produced by Lil Jon, included the hit single "My Boo" by Ghost Town DJ's. It was sampled by Ciara in her 2013 hit "Body Party". In 2016, 20 years after its initial release, the song re-entered the Billboard Hot 100 chart at No. 29 due to a viral dance video. Lil Jon completed the series, releasing So So Def Bass All-Stars Vol. II (1997) and So So Def Bass All-Stars Vol. III (1998).

Apart from his label commitments, Lil Jon was a radio personality/DJ on Atlanta radio station, V-103, continued to produce music for outside music artists, and was still working as a DJ at popular clubs around the city.

1995–2005: Lil Jon & the East Side Boyz 
Lil Jon collaborated with Big Sam and Lil' Bo to form a musical rap group: the East Side Boyz.

1995–1998: Formation and early releases 
In 1996, the group released their debut single, "Who U Wit?". The song is credited as bringing the term "crunk" into hip-hop currency. In 1997, the group released their debut album Get Crunk, Who U Wit: Da Album. The singles "Who U Wit?" (produced by Lil Jon) and "Shawty Freak a Lil Sumthin" (produced by DJ Toomp) charted on the Hot R&B/Hip-Hop Songs chart at No. 70 and No. 62, respectively.

1999–2001: We Still Crunk! and Put Yo Hood Up 
In 2000, through the newly created label Black Market, the group released their breakthrough album We Still Crunk! which featured the single "I Like Dem Girlz" which reached No. 55 on the Billboard R&B chart and No. 3 on the Billboard Hot Rap Tracks chart.

The team was well equipped with prior experience at promoting albums and worked to grow the group's fan base across radio markets. Promotional street teams that were hired major music labels to promote their repertoire, began to talk within music promotion circles on how successful Lil Jon and his team were on the ground and were gaining radio airplay in radio markets that were usually difficult for non local artists to break into.

Bryan Leach, formerly an A&R executive at the now defunct New York based label TVT Records, heard about the group and attended their Atlanta show. He was blown away by the group's immense energy. Leach told HitQuarters: "It was like early Beastie Boys, when they had the energy of a rock group but they were rapping, and that energy is what crunk music is all about." By 2002, Leach signed Lil Jon & the East Side Boyz to TVT Records with Black Market delivering the albums to the label. The group released the album Put Yo Hood Up, which combined previously released tracks with new ones. "Bia' Bia'", which featured rappers Ludacris, Too Short, New York based DJ Big Kap, along with New Orleans rapper Chyna Whyte was the group's first single to be played nationally. "Bia' Bia'" peaked at No. 97 on the Billboard Hot 100 and No. 47 on the Billboard R&B chart. The album was certified gold by the RIAA in June 2002.

2002–2003: Kings of Crunk, Certified Crunk and Part II 
In 2002, the group released their sophomore studio album under the label Kings of Crunk with the song "I Don't Give A..." as the first single. The song featured former No Limit Records artist Mystikal and former Ruthless Records artist, Krayzie Bone. It peaked at No. 50 on the Billboard R&B chart. The group's next single, "Get Low" featured fellow Atlanta hip hop group Ying Yang Twins and became popular in nightclubs nationwide; it reached the top ten on the Billboard Hot 100. The album was certified multi-platinum by the RIAA in August 2004. The song was also featured in Need for Speed: Underground, which plays in the main menu as well as gameplay. In 2003, the group released Part II, a remix album of previously released singles with a two new songs.

2004–2005: Crunk Juice and break-up 
In 2004, Lil Jon & the East Side Boyz released what would be the group's last studio album, Crunk Juice. The lead single "What U Gon' Do" featuring BME Recordings artist Lil' Scrappy peaked at No. 22 on the Billboard Hot 100, No. 13 on the Billboard R&B chart, and No. 5 on the Billboard Rap chart. The second single, "Lovers & Friends" featuring Usher and Ludacris, peaked at No. 3 on the Billboard Hot 100, No. 2 on the Billboard R&B Chart, and No. 1 on the Billboard Rap chart. The album was certified multi-platinum in January 2005, two months after it was released. In 2005, after releasing six studio albums together and amidst ongoing creative and financial conflicts with TVT, the group disbanded.

2006–present: Solo career 
In 2006, Lil Jon, in an attempt to fulfill his obligations to TVT released the single "Snap Yo Fingers". The song was produced by Lil Jon and features BME Recordings artist E-40 and Sean P. The song peaked at No. 7 on the Billboard Hot 100 and was certified platinum on November 22, 2006. After the song was released, Lil Jon vowed to never to record for TVT Records again. In 2008, TVT Records, embroiled in legal battles, filed for Chapter 11 bankruptcy.

In 2009, Lil Jon was featured on Jay Sean's double platinum single "Do You Remember" that was featured in the film remake of The Karate Kid. On June 8, 2010, Lil Jon release his first solo album, Crunk Rock, through Universal Republic Records. It featured artists such as LMFAO, Ying Yang Twins, Pitbull, 3OH3, Ice Cube, Waka Flocka Flame, Stephen Marley, Damian Marley and more. The album peaked at No. 8 on the Billboard R&B/Hip Hop Albums chart and reached No. 5 on the Billboard Rap Albums chart. The single "Hey" featuring 3OH3 was also featured on MTV's Jersey Shore Soundtrack with the entire cast appearing in the music video. The second single, "Outta Your Mind" was featured in the film Project X and used by Alex & Twitch on the Fox television series, So You Think You Can Dance, which is considered to be the finest hip-hop routine ever performed on the show.

2011: Turbulence 

On May 14, 2011 Alongside with Steve Aoki & Laidback Luke
They released the song "Turbulence". It was released on May 14, 2011, as a digital download in the United Kingdom and was released on July 17, 2011, as an EP. The radio edit version of the song was included on the bonus track version of Steve Aoki's debut album Wonderland. The song is also the current official goal song for the Toronto Maple Leafs.

In July 2011, he released a song with LMFAO called "Drink" through Ultra Records. It was used in the trailer for the film The World's End. In 2012, he appeared on three songs featured in the film Step Up Revolution and on the film's soundtrack. He would go on to perform one of the songs from the film, "Goin' In" with Jennifer Lopez on the season finale of TV show American Idol. Being the fhith person to play basketball to shoot baceballs out of a paintball gun.

In 2013, Lil Jon collaborated with DJ Snake and released "Turn Down for What" on Columbia Records. The song reached No. 1 on Billboard'''s Rhythmic and Hot Dance/Electronic Songs charts, No. 2 on the Dance/Mix Show Airplay chart, No. 4 on the Hot 100, and No. 5 on the Mainstream Top 40. The song has had significant use in media and was certified 6× platinum by the RIAA. Lil Jon also partnered with Zumba Fitness to create a new nightclub tour titled "Zumba Nightclub Series" and for the Zumba Fitness series, he released a new song called "Work".

On July 22, 2014, Lil Jon released the single "Bend Ova" featuring Tyga on Epic Records. The song was featured in the two part series finale of the NBC TV show Parks and Recreation. "Take It Off" featuring Yandel and Becky G was released on July 22, 2016, and the single "Alive" was released in 2018, featuring Offset and 2 Chainz on Geffen Records. In December 2018, Lil Jon released the Christmas single "All I Really Want for Christmas" (featuring Kool-Aid Man) in cooperation with the Kool-Aid brand of soft drinks.

In 2018, Lil Jon appeared in volume two of the Future-led soundtrack for the film Superfly. The following year, he appeared in the soundtrack for Spies in Disguise, curated by Mark Ronson.

Other ventures
 BME Recordings 
In 2004, Smith, McDowell, Phillips and Searcy launched BME Recordings in a joint venture with Warner Bros. Records and released The King of Crunk & BME Recordings Present: Trillville & Lil Scrappy (2004) with Lil Jon producing most of the album. The album single "Some Cut" has been a favorite of samplers over the years. The label entered the San Francisco Bay Area hyphy music scene with Bay Area rapper E-40, releasing the album, My Ghetto Report Card (2006) with the Lil Jon produced single "Tell Me When to Go". The label released the album Bred 2 Die, Born 2 Live (2006) by Lil Scrappy.

 Acting career 
In 2003, Lil Jon was the voice of Jang Ryang in the American remake of the South Korean film Volcano High, broadcast on MTV. After he was famously parodied by comedian Dave Chappelle, he would go on to make numerous appearances on the Comedy Central series Chappelle's Show. He has since appeared on various TV shows including André 3000's animated series Class of 3000, Crank Yankers, Robotomy, Hell's Kitchen, Tiny House Nation, Hollywood Puppet Show, American Idol, About A Boy, Celebrity Apprentice, and All-Star Celebrity Apprentice, Bar Rescue, The Bachelorette, Hip Hop Squares, and a commercial for Bud Light. Lil Jon is a fan of the television show The Walking Dead and has made multiple appearances as a guest on Talking Dead. On January 29, 2019, a Pepsi Super Bowl commercial featuring Lil Jon, rapper Cardi B and actor Steve Carell was released.

 Musical style and influences 
Jason Birchmeier of AllMusic has described Lil Jon's production as "bass-heavy", and his album Put Yo Hood Up as having "a long and varied list of guest rappers to accompany the beats". Describing that album with guest performers, Birchmeier remarked: "The end result is an album that resembles a street-level mixtape rather than a traditional artist-oriented album".

Lil Jon was specifically influenced by 2 Live Crew, 8Ball & MJG, Three 6 Mafia, OutKast, Geto Boys, UGK, N.W.A, Dr. Dre, and Sir Mix-A-Lot. Alex Henderson, also of AllMusic, contrasted Lil Jon's style of "rowdy, in-your-face, profanity-filled party music" with other Southern rappers, those who "have a gangsta/thug life agenda" and those who convey "serious sociopolitical messages". Lil Jon has also found influence in rock music, having worked with Rick Rubin and Korn. He expresses this influence in his aggressive delivery and 'yelling' style of rap. He was seen on VH1's 100 Greatest Artists of All-Time program wearing a Bad Brains T-shirt, and he used to listen to Lynyrd Skynyrd while growing up in the South in the 1970s. For Trick Daddy's "Let's Go", Lil Jon sampled the bass line from Ozzy Osbourne's "Crazy Train".

 Personal life 
Since 2004, Lil Jon married his wife Nicole and together they have a son, Nathan (known as DJ Young Slade). Lil Jon has stated that one of his greatest joys is seeing everything come full circle with his son, who has been DJing since the age of 11.

He is an avid fan of all of Atlanta's sports teams which included the NHL's Atlanta Thrashers until they relocated to Winnipeg in 2011. He has since become a fan of the Vegas Golden Knights, and appears in the team 2019 documentary Valiant. He is also a fan of University of Tennessee Volunteers, which adopted his hit song "Turn Down for What" on third downs, changing it to "Third Down for What". On October 4, 2014, Lil Jon made an appearance via Jumbotron encouraging the Volunteers to beat the University of Florida Gators also visited the team, giving them a pep talk.

Lil Jon has been using his star power and wealth to help children in underdeveloped countries gain access to a proper education. He has helped to fund two schools in the village of Mafi Atitekpo in Ghana, in partnership with the charity Pencils of Promise. The first, Abomayaw D.A. Kindergarten, opened in October 2017. The second school, Mafi Atitekpo DA Primary School, broke ground in January 2018 and will enroll 313 children. In 2019, Pencils of Promise honored both Lil Jon and Trevor Noah in recognition of their charitable efforts at the charity's annual gala.

In 2018, a 16-year-old student of Douglass High School reached out to rapper and alumnus Killer Mike via Instagram in a last-chance attempt to raise money to cover expenses for the marching band to travel to New Orleans to march in the annual Mardi Gras parade. To his surprise, Killer Mike not only responded voicing his support, but he also recruited fellow alumni Lil Jon and T.I., who both jumped at the chance to help out their alma mater. Together with additional donors, the trip was covered for the students.

Lil Jon supports his hometown of Atlanta and is one of Atlanta's famous residents that appear on the LED screen in Hartsfield-Jackson Airport to welcome new arrivals to the city. He also appears on the Jumbotron at Mercedes Benz Stadium to hype up fans during Atlanta Falcons and Atlanta United games. During Super Bowl LIII held in Atlanta in 2019, Lil Jon appeared in the NFL's "This Is Atlanta" promotional video to welcome incoming visitors to the city, alongside fellow Atlanta residents, former Atlanta Hawks basketball player Dominique Wilkins, former Atlanta Braves baseball player Chipper Jones, civil right icons Congressman John Lewis and former congressman, Ambassador to the United Nations and Mayor of Atlanta Andrew Young, rappers Big Boi and Killer Mike, singer Chili (TLC), comedian Jeff Foxworthy, and television personality Ryan Seacrest. Organized by musician Jermaine Dupri, a host of Atlanta area high school drummers, local brass musicians and the Atlanta Symphony Orchestra also appear and supply the underlying music. Lil Jon also appeared in CBS Sports' official open of the network's coverage of the game.

 Discography 

 Solo albums Crunk Rock (2010)

 Collaborative albums Get Crunk, Who U Wit: Da Album (with the East Side Boyz) (1997)We Still Crunk!! (with the East Side Boyz) (2000)Put Yo Hood Up (with the East Side Boyz) (2001)Kings of Crunk (with the East Side Boyz) (2002)Crunk Juice (with the East Side Boyz) (2004)

 Awards and nominations 

 Grammy Awards 
A Grammy Award (stylized as GRAMMY) is an award presented by the Recording Academy to recognize achievement in the music industry.

 MTV Video Music Awards 
An MTV Video Music Award (abbreviated as a VMA) is an award presented by the cable channel MTV to honor the best in the music video medium.

|-
|rowspan="4"| 2014 || rowspan="4"| "Turn Down for What" (with DJ Snake)  || MTV Clubland Award || 
|-
|Best Direction || 
|-
|Best Visual Effects || 
|-
|Best Art Direction || 
|}

 American Music Awards 
The American Music Awards is an annual awards ceremony created by Dick Clark in 1973. Lil Jon & the East Side Boyz has received two nominations, winning one for Favorite Rap/Hip-Hop Band/Duo/Group.

|-
| 2003 || Lil Jon & the East Side Boyz || Favorite Rap/Hip-Hop Band/Duo/Group || 
|-
|  || Lil Jon & the East Side Boyz || Favorite Rap/Hip-Hop Band/Duo/Group || 

 Filmography 
 Film 
2004: Soul Plane2005: Boss'n Up (with Snoop Dogg)
2006: Date Movie2006: Scary Movie 4 Television Volcano High (2003)The Sharon Osbourne Show (2003)MadTV (2003)All of Us (2004)Like Family (2004)Chappelle's Show (2004)How I'm Living (2004)MadTV (2005)The Andy Milonakis Show (Season 1 Episode 1 (2005))MTV Cribs (2005)Wild 'n Out (2006)Criss Angel Mindfreak (2006)Pimp My Ride UK (Host) (2006)Crank Yankers (voice) (2007)Class of 3000 (2007)Freaknik: The Musical (voice only) (2010)Ridiculousness (2012)The Celebrity Apprentice (Season 11 (2011) and All Stars (2013))The Jenny McCarthy Show (2013)Watch What Happens Live (2013)Master of the Mix (guest judge) (2013)The Eric André Show (2014)About A Boy (2014)Saturday Night Live (2014)Comedy Bang! Bang! (2015)Hell's Kitchen (2016)Hollywood Medium With Tyler Henry (2016)Talking Dead (2017)Tiny House Nation (2017)The Bachelorette (2018)Bar Rescue (2018)Hollywood Puppet Show (2018)The Rap Game (2019)

 Video games 25 to Life (2006) (while Lil Jon does not appear physically in the game, posters of Lil Jon can be found in the game)Tony Hawk's American Wasteland (2005)Def Jam Icon'' (2007)

See also 
 List of celebrities who own wineries and vineyards
 List of artists who reached number one in the United States
 Honorific nicknames in popular music
 List of best-selling singles
 List of Billboard Hot 100 chart achievements and milestones

References

External links 

 Official website

1972 births
Living people
21st-century American rappers
21st-century American male musicians
African-American crunk musicians
African-American DJs
African-American male rappers
African-American record producers
American hip hop DJs
American hip hop record producers
Grammy Award winners for rap music
Rappers from Atlanta
Rappers from Georgia (U.S. state)
Atlantic Records artists
Epic Records artists
Geffen Records artists
Interscope Records artists
Republic Records artists
TVT Records artists
Universal Records artists
The Apprentice (franchise) contestants
21st-century African-American musicians
20th-century African-American people